Lake Kaiiwi is a dune lake in the Northland Region of New Zealand. It is located to the Northwest of Dargaville and is one of the three dune lakes collectively referred to as Kai Iwi Lakes Reserve (Taharoa Domain). 

The lake has no outflow, with only minor drain inflows in the South of the lake and from the larger Lake Taharoa. The lake margin is vegetated by scrub (70%) and pine plantation (30%), with pasture in the larger catchment.

History
Lake Kaiiwi was named after chief Te Kaiiwi, the first person to visit the lake. It is the scene of the Battle of Lake Kaiiwi.

See also
List of lakes in New Zealand

References

Kaiiwi
Kaipara District